Titik Handayani Rajo Bintang (born 10 February 1981), known professionally as Titi Radjo Padmaja (formerly Titi Sjuman), is an Indonesian award winning composer, drummer, singer, songwriter, and actress.

Early life
Titi is the daughter of businessman Idham Rajo Bintang and Susi Aryani. Her father Idham was a hotel owner and entertainment businessman in Lake Maninjau area, as well as a show and entertainment entrepreneur in Jakarta. After completing her basic education in Maninjau, Agam, West Sumatra, Titi continued her secondary school in Padang . She then took a bachelor's degree at the Indonesian Daya Music Institute, Jakarta.

Titi is also the youngest sister of businesswoman and political activist Popi Mailani, as well as Model and Actress Suci Indah Sari (daughter-in-law to Indonesian Diplomat Nana Sutresna Sastradidjaja).

Career
Titi is fond of sports and never wears skirts. In high school, she supposed to study economics but she switched to drums because she wanted to do something "different". She furthered her drum studies at Farabi Music School and Daya Music Institute. It was here that Titi met Sri Aksan Sjuman, one of her instructor at Farabi who she later married then divorced.  After graduation, she performed at the Java Jazz Festival; she also performed with artists such as Ruth Sahanaya.

Titi made her feature film debut in Djenar Maesa Ayu's 2007 film Mereka Bilang, Saya Monyet! (They Say I'm a Monkey!). She was initially contracted to provide a soundtrack for the film with her then husband, Sri Aksan Sjuman (also known as Wong Aksan), Maesa's brother. However, Maesa later asked her to take the lead role; after being cajoled by her husband and sister-in-law, Titi accepted. Aksan told her "in a kissing scene, when [she] kiss[es] a man, [her] body should not reject it".

In 2010, Titi starred in Minggu Pagi di Victoria Park (Sunday Morning in Victoria Park), a film about immigrant workers in Hong Kong. For her role, she met with immigrant laborers in Indonesia and Hong Kong to "get a deeper understanding" of the role. That same year, she and her husband provided the soundtrack to Tanah Air Beta (My Homeland). Although there were some scheduling conflicts, she was able to complete both.

In February 2011, Titi took her first role as an antagonist, appearing in Rindu Purnama (Longing for the Full Moon). She disliked the role as she disapproved of her character's actions. Later that year, she and her husband composed the score to Sang Penari (The Dancer), a film based on the Ronggeng Dukuh Paruk trilogy by Ahmad Tohari, over a period of a month and a half.

Awards and recognition 
Titi has won the first annual Extra Joss Awards in November 2000. Eight years later, she won two Indonesian Movie Awards for Best Actress: Her first was Best Newcomer for Mereka Bilang, Saya Monyet, while the second was for her role in Minggu Pagi di Victoria Park. Her role in Mereka Bilang, Saya Monyet! garnered her a Citra Award at the Indonesian Film Festival for Best Actress, while Titi and her husband won a Citra Award for Best Soundtrack for the 2009 film King. She has said that receiving awards is a bonus which drives her to work harder.

Personal life
Titi was married to fellow musician Sri Aksan Sjuman (formerly of Dewa 19) on Sunday, August 15, 2004, at the Al Azhar Mosque, Kebayoran Baru, South Jakarta. The application procession itself was held on New Year's Day 2004. She often collaborated with Aksan on writing film scores. The couple welcomed their daughter Miyake Shakuntala Sjuman, more known as Miyake Keinaka. Their marriage lasted for 9 years, but in the end, Titi filed for divorce from Aksan on 14 February 2013 and became officially divorced by 7 March 2013.

On 2016, Titi remarried to businessman Adrianto Djokosoetono, the only son of Purnomo Prawiro, and grandson of Mutiara Siti Fatimah, founder of the Indonesian taxi company, Blue Bird Group. Adrianto is the third generation of the Blue Bird Group, alongside his siblings and cousins. By 2020, Titi and Adrianto welcomed their son Bhaskara Deva Purnomo Djokosoertono.

Titi is the youngest sister of businesswoman and political activist Popi Mailani, and ex-Model and Actress Suci Indah Sari (daughter-in-law to Indonesian Diplomat Nana Sutresna Sastradidjaja). She is also the sister-in-law to Dr. Noni Sri Ayati Purnomo, a well-known philanthropist, President Director and CEO of Blue Bird Group Holding, and one of one of South-East Asia's most influential business leader. Titi is also related to Indonesian celebrity Nikita Willy who is married to Indra Priawan Djokosoetono, her husband Adrianto's cousin.

Inspirations 
Titi enjoys the work of American composer John Williams, citing his works on Star Wars, Memoirs of a Geisha, and Home Alone as some of her favourites.

Filmography

Television

TV commercials

Music

Singles

Film Soundtracks

Awards and Nominations

Related figures
Bambang Pamungkas (soccer)
Chris John (boxing)
Denny Sumargo (basketball)
Joe Taslim (judo)
Eko Yuli Irawan (weightlifting)
Wewey Wita (Pencak Silat)
Diananda Choirunissa (archery)

References
Footnotes

Bibliography

1981 births
Citra Award winners
Indonesian songwriters
Indonesian actresses
Indonesian female models
Minangkabau people
Living people